The United Nations International Day in Support of Victims of Torture is an international observance held annually on 26 June to speak out against the crime of torture and to honour and support victims and survivors throughout the world.

History 
The day was selected by the United Nations General Assembly for two reasons. First, on 26 June 1945, the United Nations Charter was signed during the midst of World War II – the first international instrument obliging UN members to respect and promote human rights. Second, 26 June 1987 was when the United Nations Convention against Torture and Other Cruel, Inhuman or Degrading Treatment or Punishment came into effect.

The decision to annually observe the International Day in Support of Victims of Torture was taken by the UN General Assembly at the proposal of Denmark, which is home to the world-renowned International Rehabilitation Council for Torture Victims (IRCT).

The first 26 June events were launched in 1998. Since then, nearly 100 organizations in dozens of countries all over the world mark the day each year with events, celebrations and campaigns.

On 16 July 2009, the International Day in Support of Victims of Torture was chosen as a public holiday in Bosnia and Herzegovina.

Past observances

Global campaign 

Every year the IRCT monitors the campaign plans of organizations around the world and towards the end of the year publishes the 26 June Global Report  where it describes the events held in commemoration of the day.  According to the latest 26 June Global Report (2012), at least 100 organizations in 60 countries around the world commemorated the day with conferences, workshops, peaceful rallies, cultural and musical events, events for children, etc.

List of organizations reported to have held events to commemorate the day in 2012:

: Albanian Rehabilitation Centre for Trauma and Torture (ARCT) 
: Equipo Argentino de Trabajo e Investigación Psicosocial (EATIP) 
: Civil Society Institute (CSI), Foundation Against Violation of Law (FAVL) 
: Phoenix Centre; Service for the Treatment and Rehabilitation of Torture Survivors (STARTTS); and Survivors of Torture and Trauma Assistance and Rehabilitation Service (STTARS) 
: Centre for Rehabilitation of Torture Survivors (CRTS); Bangladesh Centre for Human Rights and Development (BCHRD); and Bangladesh Human Rights Commission (BHRC) 
: Instituto de Terapia E Investigación Sobre las Secuelas de la Tortura y la Violencia Estatal (ITEI) 
: Vive Žene Centre for Therapy and Rehabilitation 
: Grupo Tortura Nunca Mais / Rio de Janeiro 
: Solidarité d'Actions pour la Paix / Grand Lacs 
: Trauma Centre Cameroon 
: Transcultural Psychosocial Organization 
: Canadian Centre for International Justice (CCIJ) 
: Association Jeunesse pour la Paix et la Non Violence / Centre de Réhabilitation des Victimes de la Torture (AJPNV/CRVT) 
: Corporación Centro de Atención Psicosocial (CAPS-CO) 
: Rehabilitation Centre for Torture Victims (RCT) Zagreb 
: OASIS Centre for Treatment and Rehabilitation of Victims of Torture and Trauma (OASIS); Committee of Observers of Human Rights (CODHO); GIPROCOME; Regroupement des Mamans de Kamituga (REMAK); SOS Jeunesse et Enfance en Detresse (SOS JED); Centre Psycho Médical pour la Réhabilitation des Victimes de la Torture / Solidarité Pour la Promotion Sociale et la Paix (CPMRVT/SOPROP); SAVE CONGO; Amis des Victimes des Violations des Droits Humains (AVVDH) 
: El Nadeem Center for Psychological Management and Rehabilitation of Victims of Violence 
: Salvadoran Association of Torture Survivors (ASST) 
: Centre for Survivors of Torture in Finland (CSTF) 
: Action by Christians for the Abolition of Torture (ACAT) 
: EMPATHY, Psycho-Rehabilitation Centre for Victims of Torture, Violence and Pronounced Stress Impact (RCT/EMPATHY); Georgian Centre for Psychosocial and Medical Rehabilitation of Torture Victims (GCRT) 
: Berlin Treatment Center for Torture Victims (bzfo); Medical Care Service for Refugees Bochum (MFH Bochum)
: Asian Human Rights Commission (AHRC) 
: Cordelia Foundation for the Rehabilitation of Torture Victims 
: Centre for Care of Torture Victims (CCTV); Centre for Organisation, Research and Education / Human to Humane Transcultural Centre for Trauma and Torture (CORE/H2H); South India Cell for Human Rights Education and Monitoring (SICHREM); Tibetan Torture Survivors' Program (TTSP) 
: Alliance of Democracy for Papua (ALDP); Alliance of Civil Society for Anti-Torture (SIKAP); and Rehabilitation Action for Torture Victims in Aceh (RATA) 
: Organization for Defending Victims of Violence (ODVV) 
: Bahjat Al-Fuad Rehabilitation of Medical & Psychological Centre for Torture Victims (BFRCT) 
: SPIRASI, The Centre for the Care of Survivors of Torture (CCST) 
: Public Committee Against Torture in Israel (PCATI) 
: Mwatikho Torture Survivors Organization (MATESO); Independent Medico-Legal Unit (IMLU); Center for Victims of Torture (CVT-Kenya); Centre Against Torture (CAT-Kenya); International Rescue Committee at Hagadera Refugee Camp (IRC-Hagadera) 
: Kosovo Rehabilitation Centre for Torture Victims (KRCT) 
: GOLOS SVOBODY Public Foundation 
: Khiam Rehabilitation Center for Victims of Torture (KRC) 
: Liberia Association of Psychosocial Services (LAPS) 
: Colectivo Contra la Tortura y la Impunidad (CCTI) 
: Rehabilitation Centre for Torture Victims – "Memoria" 
: Association Medicale de Réhabilitation des Victimes de la Torture (AMRVT) 
: People's Education Assistance and Counselling for Empowerment (PEACE) 
: Centre for Victims of Torture Nepal (CVICT) 
: Refugee Trauma Recovery (RTR) 
: Youth Education on Human Rights and Civil Responsibility (YEHRCR); Prisoners Rehabilitation and Welfare Action (PRAWA) 
: Human Development Organization (HDO); SACH Struggle for Change 
: Treatment and Rehabilitation Center for Victims of Torture (TRC) 
: Asian Medical Students Association – Philippines (AMSA-Philippines); Balay Rehabilitation Center; Medical Action Group (MAG) 
: Interregional Nongovernmental Organization Committee Against Torture (INGOCAT) 
: Victimes de Violences Rehabilitées, le Centre de Soins du CAPREC (VIVRE/CAPREC) 
: International Aid Network Centre for Rehabilitation of Torture Victims (IAN CRTV) 
: Coordinadora para la Prevención y denuncia de la Tortura (CPDT) 
: Centre for the Study of Violence and Reconciliation/Programme: Trauma and Transition Programme (CSVR/TTP); and The Trauma Centre for Survivors of Violence and Torture (TCSVT) 
: Community Association for Psychosocial Services (CAPS) 
: The Trauma Centre For Survivors of Violence and Torture (TCSVT) 
: Survivors Associated (SA); Family Rehabilitation Centre (FRC); Human Rights Office – Kandy 
: Red Cross – Stockholm; Red Cross – Malmö 
: World Organisation Against Torture (OMCT) 
: Collective of Associations Against Impunity in Togo (CACIT) 
: Centre of Social Action, Rehabilitation and Readjustment for the victims of torture (SOHRAM-CASRA); Foundation for Social and Legal Studies (TOHAV) 
: African Centre for Treatment and Rehabilitation of Torture Victims (ACTV) 
: London Guantanamo Campaign (LGC); Freedom From Torture; Refugee Therapy Centre (RTC); Zimbabwe Human Rights NGO Forum and Redress 
: Survivors of Torture, International; Bellevue/NYU Program for Survivors of Torture; Center for Survivors of Torture, San Jose; Center for Survivors of Torture and War Trauma (CSTWT); Florida Center for Survivors of Torture – A Program of Gulf Coast Jewish Family Services, Inc. (FCST); Program for Survivors of Torture and Severe Trauma at the Center for Multicultural Human Services (a program of NVFS); Center for Victims of Torture (CVT); Center for Survivors of Torture, Dallas; National Religious Campaign Against Torture (NRCAT) 
: Red de Apoyo por la Justicia y la Paz

In Asia the Asian Human Rights Commission holds regional events every year. Anti-torture networks in various Asian countries that still suffer from the widespread use of torture hold rallies and public events.

See also
International Rehabilitation Council for Torture Victims

References

External links
 Official Website of the International Day in Support of Victims of Torture – 26 June at the United Nations
 26 June – UN day against torture  at the IRCT
 https://web.archive.org/web/20110721085828/https://www.communitytv.hk/AHRClive/ live stream of 2009's torture day commemoration in Asia/Hong Kong (26 June 2009 12 am HKT Time, 4am GMT)
 Tibetan exiles ask China to "Stop Torture in Tibet"

Support of torture victims
Torture victim support
June observances
1998 introductions